Frutillar Airport  is an airport serving Frutillar, a town at the western end of Llanquihue Lake in the Los Lagos Region of Chile.

The runway lies alongside the Pan-American Highway just to the west of Frutillar, and has an additional  of grass overrun on the south end.

See also

Transport in Chile
List of airports in Chile

References

External links
Frutillar Airport at OpenStreetMap
Frutillar Airport at OurAirports

Frutillar Airport at FallingRain

Airports in Los Lagos Region